Lesego Nkaiseng (born 4 May 1992), better known as DJ Speedsta, is a South African DJ and TV personality from Johannesburg, South Africa. He is best known for his hit single, "Mayo".

Career 
In April 2015, he joined YFM to host two shows includes: The Hip Hop Floor and Hot 9Nine – Hip Hop. In 2017, he also joined Metro FM to host Absolute Hip Hop alongside Luthando Shosha.
On  January 25, 2019, his debut studio album  Bottlebrush Street was released. The album features Zoocci Coke Dope, Casper Nyovest and Riky Rick.
At the 2019 DStv Mzansi Viewers Choice Awards he was nominated for Favourite DJ.
Following year at the 2020 South Africa  Hip Hop Awards, he was nominated for Best DJ.

On July 9, 2021, he co-host SABC 1 music show  Live Amp alongside  with DJ Lamiez.

In 2021, he co-hosted season 6 of the talent show competition 1's and 2's on SABC 1.

On August 13, 2021, his single "Pardon My French" featuring Zoocci Coke Dope & Lucasraps was released. Speedsta received a nomination for DJ of the Year at the 2021 South African Hip Hop Awards.

Discography

Studio albums 
 Bottlebrush Street (2019)

Mixtapes

Filmography

Television

Awards and nominations

References

External links 

1992 births
South African hip hop DJs
Living people
People from Gauteng
Musicians from Johannesburg
South African musicians
Hip hop DJs